Club Deportivo Orientación Marítima is a Spanish football team based in Arrecife, Lanzarote, in the autonomous community of the Canary Islands. Founded in 1954, it plays in Divisiones Regionales de Fútbol in Canary Islands, holding home games at Ciudad Deportiva de Lanzarote, with a capacity of 7,000 spectators.

Season to season

1 season in Segunda División B
11 seasons in Tercera División

Famous players
 Nacho Castro
 David Martín
 Santi Torres

External links
Official website 
Futbolme team profile 

Football clubs in the Canary Islands
Sport in Lanzarote
Association football clubs established in 1954
1954 establishments in Spain
Arrecife